Rio Rico High School (RRHS) is the public high school for Rio Rico, Arizona. It is the only high school in the Santa Cruz Valley Unified School District.

 RRHS  is home to an excelling Cambridge Program (receiving top turnouts for A stars in the nation), an expansive sports program, and a growing arts department.

References

External links 
 Santa Cruz Valley Unified – Rio Rico HS
 School Report Card from the Arizona Department of Education

Schools in Santa Cruz County, Arizona
Public high schools in Arizona
1996 establishments in Arizona